A. Eric Dott was a publisher who was involved primarily in role-playing games and miniatures wargames.

Career
When Charles S. Roberts encountered financial problems in the early 1960s, he decided to get out of the publishing business and turned Avalon Hill over to its two biggest creditors: Monarch Services (his printer) and the Smith Box Company (his box maker) - Monarch Services, under president Eric Dott, would eventually become the sole owner of Avalon Hill. Avalon Hill published the third edition of Chaosium's RuneQuest in 1984, which Dott called the "Cadillac" of the Avalon Hill game line. 

Dott was the owner of The Avalon Hill Game Company before going public as Monarch Avalon, Inc. and its eventual sale to Hasbro.

Death
Dott died at Gilchrist Hospice on April 4, 2016 at age 89.

References

External links
 

2016 deaths
American publishers (people)